Charles E. Taylor also known as "Red Flag" Taylor and "Red Flag Charlie" was an American politician, editor, orator, who served as a member of the Montana State Senate from January 5, 1925 to March 9, 1925, from January 3, 1927 to March 5, 1927, and from January 7, 1929 to March 13, 1929. Taylor started off as an editor of The Producers News which was a popular farmer-labor newspaper in Plentywood. He joined the Communist Party of the United States of America in 1922 but kept it a secret from the public.

During the early 1920s, Montana was affected by droughts which had farmers lose about 2 million acres of land in 11,000 farms which was about 20% of all farm land in Montana. The first communist to be elected during this time (and in the United States as a whole) was Rodney Salisbury who was an early follower of Taylor, who became Sheriff of Sheridan County from 1922 to 1928 due to Taylor's support.  Taylor thought Salisbury was “an extremist and kind of a Wobbly type.”

There was a rumor that that at about 5:45 AM on November 30, 1926, Salisbury, along with three other people, robbed the Treasurers Office getting away with $116,579.25 ($1,954,823.26 as of December 2022) in order to fund socialist activities, this rumor caused Salisbury to lose the 1928 election. On January 5, 1925, Taylor was elected to the Montana Senate. 

During his later years as a politician, his advocacy of the Communist Party contributed towards his political decline. When he was first elected as Farmer-Labor ticket to the Montana State Senate most people did not know he was a communist.

References 

American newspaper editors
Montana state senators
Farmer–Labor Party (United States)
Communist Party USA politicians
Year of birth missing
Place of birth missing
Year of death missing
Place of death missing